Sohel Rana  (born 27 March 1995) is a Bangladeshi footballer who plays as a midfielder. He currently plays for Bashundhara Kings and the Bangladesh national team.

Club career
Rana made top division debut with Mohammedan SC back in 2011. After playing two seasons for the Blacks And Whites, he moved to Sheikh Jamal DC in 2013–14 season.

International career

Youth team
Rana made his debut for Bangladesh U-23 in a friendly with Nepal U-23, played at Bangladesh Army Stadium, Bangladesh on 25 August 2014. On his debut, he scored the match-winning goal for the home team in the 14th minute of the 2nd half by an angular ground shot from outside the danger zone in a rain soaked heavy ground (1–0).

He first wore the U23 arm band against Syria in 2016 AFC U-23 Championship Qualifier at home, but he was the makeshift captain as Raihan Hasan received red card that night. He fully captained the Olympic side in the very next match against India which end goalless, as regular captain Raihan had the suspension order.

Senior team
Rana made his senior debut for Bangladesh in a 2014 AFC Challenge Cup qualification match against Palestine, played at Dasarath Rangasala Stadium, Nepal on 2 March 2013.

International goals

Youth team

Personal life

On 7 March 2021, Sohel Rana married Syed Tamila Sirajee, an MBA student, after their six years long relationship. On 8 February 2015, Tamila came to Bangabandhu Stadium to watch 2015 Bangabandhu Gold Cup final match where she saw and fall in love with Sohel. After that, she reached out Sohel through social media site Facebook. At first, they became friends and then lovers.

Sohel Rana is the uncle of Pappu Hossain, a goalkeeper of Saif SC and Bangladesh U-23 team. On 17 September 2019, Pappu got his call-up in Bangladesh senior national team along with regular national team member Sohel. It made headlines as uncle and nephew both were going to play for the national team together.

Honours

Club
Abahani Limited
 Bangladesh Premier League: 2017–18Dhaka Mohammedan Super Cup : 2013Sheikh Jamal Dhanmondi'''
 Bangladesh Premier League: 2013–14, 2015
 Federation Cup: 2013–14, 2014–15
 King's Cup (Bhutan): 2014

References

Living people
1995 births
Bangladeshi footballers
Bangladesh international footballers
Abahani Limited (Dhaka) players
Mohammedan SC (Dhaka) players
Sheikh Jamal Dhanmondi Club players
Association football midfielders
Footballers at the 2014 Asian Games
Footballers from Dhaka
Asian Games competitors for Bangladesh
Bashundhara Kings players
South Asian Games bronze medalists for Bangladesh
South Asian Games medalists in football